The Medieval Institute (also known as the Medieval Institute of Western Michigan University) is a research and teaching institute in the field of medieval studies associated with Western Michigan University in Kalamazoo, Michigan. The institute was founded in 1962 and offered the United States's first publicly awarded Master of Arts degree in medieval studies. Presently, the institute organizes the International Congress on Medieval Studies (an annual academic conference held for scholars specializing in, or with an interest in, medieval studies).

Publications
Publications authored by the Medieval Institute are released through the Medieval Institute Publications university press imprint. This press, which was founded in 1978 and became a member of the Association of University Presses in 2011, specializes in "archeology, art history, dance, drama, history, literature, music, philosophy, and theology of the European Middle Ages and early modern period". The press currently operates in a partnership with the German academic publishing house De Gruyter.

Book series
Major book series released by Medieval Institute Publications include the following:
 "Christianities Before Modernity"
 "Early Drama, Art, and Music"
 "Festschriften, Occasional Papers, and Lectures"
 "Late Tudor and Stuart Drama: Gender, Performance, and Material Culture"
 "Ludic Cultures, 1100–1700"
 "Monastic Life"
 "Monsters, Prodigies, and Demons: Medieval and Early Modern Constructions of Alterity"
 "New Queer Medievalisms"
 "The Northern Medieval World"
 "Premodern Transgressive Literatures"
 "Research in Medieval and Early Modern Culture"
 "Publications of the Richard Rawlinson Center"
 "Studies in Iconography: Themes and Variations"
 "Studies in Medieval and Early Modern Culture"
 "Teaching Association for Medieval Studies (TEAMS) Commentary Series"
 "TEAMS Documents of Practice"
 "TEAMS German Texts in Bilingual Editions"
 "TEAMS Middle English Texts Series"
 "TEAMS Secular Commentary Series"
 "TEAMS Varia"

Journals
Journals published by the press include:
 Medieval Prosopography
 Studies in Iconography
 ROMARD
 Medieval Feminist Forum

References

External links
 Official website.

Medieval Institute
Educational institutions established in 1962
Medieval studies research institutes